Rudkino is a rural locality (a khutor) in Gremyachenskoye Rural Settlement, Khokholsky District, Voronezh Oblast, Russia. The population was 921 as of 2010. There are 17 streets.

Geography 
Rudkino is located on the right bank of the Don River, 33 km southeast of Khokholsky (the district's administrative centre) by road. Gremyachye is the nearest rural locality.

References 

Rural localities in Khokholsky District